Warrant may refer to:

 Warrant (law), a form of specific authorization
 Arrest warrant, authorizing the arrest and detention of an individual
 Search warrant, a court order issued that authorizes law enforcement to conduct a search for evidence
 Execution warrant, a writ that authorizes the execution of a condemned person
 Warrant (philosophy), a proper justification for holding a belief
 Warrant (rhetoric), the assumption or principle that connects data to a claim
 Quo warranto, a writ requiring a person to show authority for exercising some right or power

Arts, entertainment, and media

Music
 Warrant (American band), a glam metal band from Hollywood, California
 Warrant (German band), a German speed metal band that formed in 1983

Films
 Warrant (film), a 1975 Indian Hindi-language film directed by Pramod Chakravorty
 The Warrant, a 2020 American film directed by Brent Christy

Business
 Dock warrant, a document certifying that the holder is entitled to goods at a maritime dock
 Track warrant, railroad line permission for a train's use of the main line
 Warrant of Fitness, New Zealand assurance certifying a motor vehicle
 Warrant sale, a statutory means of collecting debts in Scotland until 2001
 Warranty, a business transaction assurance
 Warranty (disambiguation), various types of warranty

Finance
 Warrant (finance), a right, without obligation, to buy or sell something at an agreed price
 Covered warrant, a warrant issued without an accompanying bond or equity
 Turbo warrant, a kind of stock option
 Warrant of payment, an order to an official to pay someone, similar to a check

Government
 Warrant (town meeting), a document used to call and outline a town meeting
 Governor general's warrant, a non-budgeted payment instrument in Canadian law
 Warrant card, a proof of identification used by police officers
 Warrant of Appointment, President of Ireland official document of high office appointment
 Warrant of Precedence for Pakistan, Pakistan protocol for officials seating at government functions
 Warrant officer (disambiguation), a rank in various military organizations
 Royal warrant (disambiguation), various documents issued by a monarch

See also
 Warrant Officer 1 (disambiguation)